Ghaleh Sar-e Olya (also Romanized as Ghal‘eh Sar-e ‘Olyā; also known as Bālā Ghal’eh, Bālā Ghal‘eh Sar, and Ghal‘eh Sar Bālā) is a village in Peyrajeh Rural District, in the Central District of Neka County, Mazandaran Province, Iran. At the 2016 census, its population was 2,501, in 630 families.

References 

Populated places in Neka County